This is a list of members of the Somali Transitional Federal Parliament. First published on August 29, 2004, the MPs were scheduled to serve until 2009.

List of selected members of the Transitional Federal Parliament as of August 29, 2004

References

 

Politics of Somalia
Government of Somalia
Somalia